Babikavan is a village in the Kajaran Municipality of the Syunik Province in Armenia.

Demographics 
Babikavan was not listed in the 2011 Armenian census. However, following the 2017 reforms, Babikavan appeared in the records with a total population of 216.

Municipal administration 
The village was a part of the community of Lernadzor until the June 2017 administrative and territorial reforms, when the village became a part of the Kajaran Municipality.

References 

Populated places in Syunik Province